Cairns State High School (CSHS) is an independent public secondary school located near the centre of Cairns, Queensland, Australia.  It was founded in 1917 and is the oldest high school in Cairns. The school caters for grades 7 though 12 and has the capacity for 1,607 enrolled students. The principal of the school is Christopher Zilm.

History 
Cairns State High School was founded in 1917 as an annex of the Cairns Central State School, and moved to its current location in 1924 as a joint high school and technical college. In 1980, the technical college relocated, thus the site became solely a high school. In May 2014, Block A of Cairns State High School - the Cairns Technical College and High School Building - was listed on the Queensland Heritage Register. This building was designed by Nigel Laman Thomas of the Department of Housing and Public Works in 1938, and built in 1939 though 1941.

Curriculum 
Cairns State High School participates in various interschool and representative sport associations, including Peninsula School Sport. The school also performs dance, drama, and music productions, hosts study tours and student exchanges, and operates programmes for high-achieving students in STEM, sports, and the arts.

As of 2021, Cairns State High School no longer offers the International Baccalaureate Diploma Program which was introduced in 2011.

Campus 
The facilities available on site include:
Auditorium
Events hall
Sports complex
Volleyball and multi-purpose courts
Science and computer laboratories
Art rooms (including kiln, printing, and photography rooms)
Practical arts rooms
Performing arts rooms (including dance studios)
Swimming pool

Awards and recognition 
The school has received the following awards:
Best Orchestra Regional Area 2006 – The Orchestras of Australia Network Awards
Finalists – Minister’s Awards for Excellence in Art
Two High Distinctions, 25 Distinctions – Australasian English Competition
Three Distinctions, Three Credits – Australasian Schools Writing Competition
Cairns State High School Symphony Orchestra has also been winners  of the competition FANFARE in 1992, 1994, 1996, 2002, 2004, 2016

Controversies

Notable alumni 

Aron Baynes, NBA professional basketball player
Cam Cairncross, former Major League Baseball player
Matthew Deane, Thai-Australian singer, model, actor and television presenter
Charlie Dixon, AFL player for the Suns and Power
Erin Holland, beauty pageant model
Bob Manning, Mayor of the Cairns Region Council
Dan Sultan, musician and activist
Brenton Thwaites, actor

Gallery

See also 
 List of schools in Far North Queensland

References

External links 
 

Public high schools in Australia
Public high schools in Queensland
Schools in Cairns
Educational institutions established in 1917
Queensland Heritage Register